The Chartered Institute of Professional Financial Managers (CIPFM) is an American professional body for financial management situated in Wilmington, Delaware. Member of Central Delaware Chamber of Commerce (CDCC) in Dover, CIPFM has a vision to educate and certify financial managers in United States and worldwide.

Affiliations 
The CIPFM has affiliations and representatives in some countries promoting its courses and membership. It also has reciprocal membership with some professional organizations with similar goals and mission.

Certifications 
The Institute offer courses leading to the award of the Chartered Financial Manager (CFM) and the Chartered Fraud Controller (CFC) designations among other courses. In line with its global vision, the institute's courses are also being offered by colleges oversees.

Membership awards 
The CIPFM offers three categories of membership which include:
 Associate Chartered Financial Manager (ACFM)
 Fellow Chartered Financial Manager (FCFM)
 Hon Fellow ( HonFCFM)

References

External links
 CIPFM Official Website
 Central Delaware Chamber of Commerce
 Royal Academy of Career Development Official Website
 Central University College Official Website
 Queen Victoria Training Official Website
 Institute of Professional Financial Advisers IPFA
 Carayol Ltd
 Institute of Professional Financial Consultants IPFC
 Elmaaly International
 Institute of Certified Public Accountants

Professional associations based in the United States